is a train station located in the town of Yakage, Oda District, Okayama Prefecture, Japan.

Lines
 Ibara Railway
 Ibara Line

Adjacent stations

|-
!colspan=5|Ibara Railway

Railway stations in Okayama Prefecture
Railway stations in Japan opened in 1999